CKNC may refer to:

CKNC-FM, a radio station in Simcoe, Ontario
CKNC-TV, a defunct television station in Sudbury, Ontario,
the original call sign of CJBC, a radio station in Toronto, Ontario.